The Tâmega or Támega is a river in Galicia, Spain and Portugal. It begins its course near Verín, Galicia, Spain, and flows to Portugal in the provinces of Trás-os-Montes and Douro Litoral.

The Tâmega River is a tributary of the Douro River. From Verín, it flows south to Portuguese city of Chaves; then it flows through a fertile valley called the Veiga. Below Chaves the river narrows to pass through mountains and valleys. Owing to low water level and frequent small dams it is not navigable, passing through the cities of Amarante and Marco de Canaveses, flowing in the Douro River, near Entre-os-Rios: in fact Entre-os-Rios means between the rivers.

The Tâmega is more important historically than economically. It has always served as an invasion route for foreign armies intent on reaching the richer southern lands of Portugal. The valley around Chaves has especially seen its share of battles and invading armies.

Like many rivers, the Tâmega suffers from pollution and the ravages of sand and gravel extraction companies. The quality of the water has deteriorated greatly. Another problem is the periodic occurrence of flooding.

Since the completion of the Torrão dam in 1988 less than 1 kilometre above the Douro river and the town of Entre-os-Rios in the municipality of Marco de Canaveses, the Tâmega has been recovering slowly from the effects of pollution. Sand extraction activities have been prohibited and many upstream cities installed modern sewage treatment plants.  

A new dam is planned between the city of Amarante and the town of Mondim de Basto. Besides producing electricity, the project will have feature a flood control system that will divert the waterflow towards the smaller Olo River. A 220 MW pumped-storage hydroelectricity facility started operating in 2022, storing 40 GWh of electricity. It cost €1.5 billion. Three more turbines are scheduled for the site, bringing the storage power to 880 MW. The project also includes two run-of-the-river hydroelectricity facilities.

Transport
The Tâmega line, which closed in 2009, was a narrow gauge railway line which closely followed the river.

See also
List of rivers of Portugal
List of rivers of Spain
Rivers of Galicia

References

External links

Rivers of Spain
Rivers of Portugal
Rivers of Galicia (Spain)
International rivers of Europe
Tributaries of the Douro River